Sangrama Vijayatunggavarman (also known as Sangramavijayottunggavarman or Sang Rama Wijaya Tungga Warman) was an emperor of Srivijaya of Sailendra dynasty, who reigned in the early 11th century in Kadaram. He is best known for being captured by the Chola Navy following the great raids of the Chola empire against Srivijaya.

The name of the emperor was inscribed on an inscription dated 1030 in Brihadeeswarar Temple, Tanjore. The inscription was made during the reign of Rajendra Chola I, to commemorate his military campaign against Srivijaya that was launched in 1025. The inscription states that the Cholas successfully sacked Kadaram and took a large heap of treasures, including the Vidhyadara-torana, the jewelled 'war gate' of Srivijaya adorned with great splendour; during this, Vijayatunggavarman was captured.

References 

Srivijaya
Indonesian Buddhist monarchs
11th-century monarchs in Asia
11th-century Indonesian people